German submarine U-999 was a Type VIIC/41 U-boat of Nazi Germany's Kriegsmarine during World War II.

She was ordered on 14 October 1941, and was laid down on 19 December 1942, at Blohm & Voss, Hamburg, as yard number 199. She was launched on 17 September 1943, and commissioned under the command of Oberleutnant zur See Hermann Hansen on 21 October 1943.

Design
German Type VIIC/41 submarines were preceded by the heavier Type VIIC submarines. U-999 had a displacement of  when at the surface and  while submerged. She had two shafts and two  propellers.

U-999 was fitted with five  torpedo tubes (four fitted at the bow and one at the stern), fourteen torpedoes, one  SK C/35 naval gun, (220 rounds), one  Flak M42 and two  C/30 anti-aircraft guns. The boat had a complement of between forty-four and fifty-two.

Service history
U-999 was scuttled in Flensburg Fjord on 5 May 1945, after participating in only one war patrol that yielded no ships sunk or damaged. The wreck was recovered and broken up in 1948.

See also
 Battle of the Atlantic

References

Bibliography

German Type VIIC/41 submarines
U-boats commissioned in 1943
World War II submarines of Germany
1943 ships
Ships built in Hamburg
Operation Regenbogen (U-boat)
Maritime incidents in May 1945
U-boats scuttled in 1945